Qendër is a former municipality in the Shkodër County, northwestern Albania. At the 2015 local government reform it became a subdivision of the municipality Malësi e Madhe. The population at the 2011 census was 4,740.

Settlements 
There are 8 settlements within Qendër.

Bogiq
Dobër
Koplik i Sipërm
Lohe e Poshtme
Kalldrun
Stërbeq
Jubicë
Kamicë-Flakë
Polvare

References 

 
Administrative units of Malësi e Madhe
Former municipalities in Shkodër County